Pablo Herrera Allepuz (born 29 June 1982, in Castellón de la Plana) is a Spanish beach volleyball player who has represented his country five times at the Summer Olympics. In 2004 in Athens, he and Javier Bosma won the silver medal. In the 2008 Olympic tournament he teamed up with Raúl Mesa and lost in the round of 16. At the 2012 Summer Olympics tournament, Herrera partnered with Adrián Gavira. The pair lost in the round of 16 to Brazilians Ricardo Santos and Pedro Cunha. At the 2016 Olympics in Rio de Janeiro Herrera once again played with Gavira, losing to eventual champions from Brazil, Alison Ceruti and Bruno Oscar Schmidt.
At the 2020 Olympics in Tokyo Herrera once again played with Gavira, losing to runner-ups from ROC (Russia), Viacheslav Krasilnikov and Oleg Stoyanovskiy.

Sponsors
Swatch

Notes

References

External links
 
 
 
 

1982 births
Living people
Spanish beach volleyball players
Men's beach volleyball players
Beach volleyball players at the 2004 Summer Olympics
Beach volleyball players at the 2008 Summer Olympics
Beach volleyball players at the 2012 Summer Olympics
Beach volleyball players at the 2016 Summer Olympics
Olympic beach volleyball players of Spain
Olympic silver medalists for Spain
Olympic medalists in beach volleyball
Sportspeople from Castellón de la Plana
Medalists at the 2004 Summer Olympics
Beach volleyball players at the 2020 Summer Olympics